Tutak-e Olya (also Romanized as Tūtak-e ‘Olyā; also known as Tūtak, Tūtak Bālā, Tūtak-e Bālā, and Tūtang-e Bālā) is a village in Hoseynabad-e Goruh Rural District, Rayen District, Kerman County, Kerman Province, Iran. At the 2006 census, its population was 25, in 6 families.

References 

Populated places in Kerman County